Rumpf is a surname, and may refer to:
Andreas Rumpf (1890–1966), German classical archaeologist
Brian E. Rumpf (born 1964), American politician from New Jersey
Ella Rumpf, Swiss actress
Georg Eberhard Rumpf, better known as Georg Eberhard Rumphius (c. 1627–1702), German-Dutch botanist
Gernot Rumpf (born 1941), German sculptor
Isaak Augustijn Rumpf (1673–1723), Governor of Dutch Ceylon
Sabine Rumpf (born 1983), German championship discus thrower
Willy Rumpf (1903–1982), German government minister

Surnames from nicknames